Top Country Albums is a chart that ranks the top-performing country music albums in the United States, published by Billboard.  In 2012, 17 different albums topped the chart; placings were based on electronic point of sale data from retail outlets.

In the issue of Billboard dated January 7, the band Lady Antebellum held the top spot with Own the Night, the album's sixth week in the top spot.  It occupied the peak position for the first four weeks of 2012 before being displaced by Toby Keith's Clancy's Tavern and subsequently returned to number one for a further four weeks beginning in the issue dated March 3.  It tied for the highest total number of weeks spent at number one during the year with Taylor Swift's Red, which reached number one in the issue of Billboard dated November 10 and remained there for the final eight weeks of the year.  The album would prove to be Swift's last entry on the Top Country Albums chart for nearly a decade, as she moved away from the country music genre with her subsequent releases.  Carrie Underwood came closest to matching the two acts' time at number one, spending seven non-consecutive weeks atop the listing with Blown Away.

Three acts reached number one in 2012 for the first time, beginning with Lionel Richie, who topped the chart in April with Tuskegee, only the second album of his 30-year solo career to enter the country albums listing.  Throughout his career with the Commodores and as a solo artist, spanning five decades, Richie was initially associated with the soul genre and later known for pop ballads, but in 2012 he recorded Tuskegee, an album of duets with country singers, which was a success on both the pop and country charts.  In late August, country-rap artist Colt Ford reached the top spot for the first time with Declaration of Independence, and two weeks later Dustin Lynch made his first appearance at number one with his self-titled debut album.  Lynch, along with fellow 2012 chart-toppers Luke Bryan and Jason Aldean, was associated with the so-called bro-country style, an emerging sub-genre which incorporated influences from rock music and hip hop and often featured lyrics relating to partying, attractive young women, and pick-up trucks.

Chart history

References

2012
United States Country Albums